Ohebach is a river of Hesse, Germany. It springs near Großropperhausen. It is a left tributary of the Efze, into which it flows near Homberg.

See also
List of rivers of Hesse

References

Rivers of Hesse
Rivers of Germany